A Fonds régional d'art contemporain (Frac) is a public regional collection of contemporary art set in one of the metropolitan or overseas regions of France. There are currently 23 Fracs across the country, organised into a national network called Platform since 2005. Fracs are funded by regions, by the state through the Ministry of Culture and by municipalities. Originally without venues, Fracs are now hosted in repurposed historical buildings, or in specifically-built art museums, depending on the size of their collection.

Founding and history 
Fracs were founded by culture minister Jack Lang, as part of a decentralization policy to move aspects of governance out to regional governments. Starting in 1982, regional funds were set up to promote and encourage contemporary art by forming regional collections, and engaging in outreach to local communities and cultural institutions.

The goals of the Frac program are:
 To build a heritage of contemporary art in the region, and support the creation of new art through the combined actions of acquisitions and commissioning works. Each Frac may decide to specialize in a particular category of contemporary art.
 To disseminate funds widely within each region, developing regular partnerships with cultural institutions, local authorities and schools.
 To raise broad awareness in contemporary art methods, through tours, speakers, events with artists, and workshops with young people.

Next generation 
Starting in 2011, the Frac next generation programme set out plans to build new physical museums for several of these collections:
 Bretagne (Rennes, designed by architect Odile Decq, opened July 6, 2012)
 Centre-Val de Loire (Orléans, designed by architects Jakob + MacFarlane, opened September 5, 2013)
 Franche-Comté (Besançon, designed by architect Kengo Kuma, opened April 6, 2013)
 Grand Large – Hauts-de-France (Dunkerque, designed by architects Lacaton et Vassal, opened November 16, 2013)
Nouvelle-Aquitaine MÉCA (Bordeaux, designed by architects Bjarke Ingels Group (BIG) and FREAKS, opened June 28, 2019)
 Provence-Alpes-Côte d'Azur (Marseille, designed by architect Kengo Kuma, opened March 22, 2013)

Frac collections 
The 23 Frac collections, as of 2015:

References

FRAC collections
Contemporary art galleries in France